The Santa Barbara Daily Sound was a daily newspaper in Santa Barbara, California that was published Tuesday through Saturday. After discontinuing publication of its print edition in late June 2012, publisher Jeramy Gordon was quoted by the Santa Barbara Independent as saying the paper would continue as a "web only" news outlet and that the company was "currently in a state of re-organization". On July 23, 2012 the website of the Daily Sound went offline and apparently it has ceased to operate.

As a free five-day-a-week publication the Daily Sound was distributed through newspaper racks and in stores, coffee shops, restaurants, schools and major workplaces. The founder and publisher was Jeramy Gordon, former managing editor of the Palo Alto Daily News. Gordon was 23 when he founded the paper.

The Daily Sound published its first color edition on September 11, 2006, launched its Saturday edition September 8, 2007, and began home delivery on April 29, 2008

The "Daily Sound" ceased publication of a Monday edition in January 2009. The paper cited the economy as that main reason.

Legal issues

Less than four months after publishing its first edition, the Santa Barbara Daily Sound received a letter from David Millstein, a San Francisco-based lawyer for the Santa Barbara News-Press, claiming that the Daily Sound's banner looked too much like the News-Press' and that it had to be changed. Gordon said that not only did the News-Press attorney demand a change in the look of the Daily Sound banner, but asked that it consider a name change, perhaps to the Los Angeles Daily Sound.

In late June and early July 2007, Santa Barbara County Public Defender Karen Atkins issues three subpoenas to Daily Sound employees, including Editor and Publisher Jeramy Gordon, demanding they turn over all photographs in the paper's possession depicting a March 14, 2007 gang melee that left a 15-year-old dead and 14-year-old charged with his murder. The Daily Sound refused to hand over the photos citing the First Amendment and California's Shield Law, but eventually gave in amid growing legal costs and possible fines that would likely shut down the paper.

Timeline
January 25, 2006: Jeramy Gordon founds NODROG Publications and hires first employee Charles Swegles.

February 1, 2006: NODROG Publications moves into its newly rented offices at 1806 Cliff Drive, Santa Barbara, Calif.

March 17, 2006: NODROG Publications hires Chris Meagher as a city hall reporter. Meagher left a year later to work for the competing Santa Barbara Independent.

March 23, 2006: NODROG Publications launches the Santa Barbara Daily Sound, a free, daily newspaper with an initial press run of 3,000 papers. That same day it was discovered that a representative of the Santa Barbara News-Press had registered all the logical domain names the Daily Sound would want for its online presence. The Daily Sound settled on www.santabarbarafree.com and later purchased www.TheDailySound.com from a San Francisco businessman.

July 2, 2006: Daily Sound publishers receive a letter from the attorney representing Wendy McCaw's Santa Barbara News-Press claiming the look and feel of the Daily Sound was too similar to that of the News-Press, hence violating the 150-year-old publications trade dress.

July 10, 2006: Daily Sound increases distribution to 5,000 papers per day.

October 1, 2006: Daily Sound hires its second staff reporter Colby Frazier who was previously with the Santa Barbara News-Press.

November 1, 2006: Daily Sound changes its banner and mast head logos in order to appease a "trade-dress" concern brought forth by the Santa Barbara News-Press citing the Daily Sound's look and feel, saying the free tabloid was too similar to the 150-year-old broadsheet daily.

January 1, 2007: To meet high demand the Daily Sound increases its circulation to 7,000 papers per day.

January 5, 2007: Daily Sound hires veteran newspaper advertising sales executive John Leonard as the paper's new General Manager. Leonard, with more than 30 year's experience in newspaper advertising, was formally the Sales Manager at the Santa Barbara News-Press.

February 1, 2007: The Santa Barbara Daily Sound outgrows its office at 1806 Cliff Drive and moves to a new location at 126 Powers Avenue in Santa Barbara.

September 8, 2007: The Daily Sound launches its Saturday edition making the free daily a six-day-a-week publication.

September 21, 2007: The Daily Sound opens a downtown office at 411 E. Canon Perdido, Ste 2.

January 10, 2008: Daily Sound co-Publisher Charles Swegles, the paper's first employee, leaves to pursue other interests.

April 29, 2008: Daily Sound launches a paid home delivery service available to every household in Southern Santa Barbara County, increases circulation to 10,000 papers per day.

October 1, 2008: Daily Sound is honored with two second place awards and one honorable mention from the California Newspaper Publishers Association.

July 3, 2012: Daily Sound ends publication.

Honors
 The Pacific Coast Business Times listed the Daily Sound in the Number 4 spot of the Top 10 companies to watch in 2007.
 California State Assembly Member Pedro Nava recognized the Daily Sound with an Assembly Certificate of Recognition on their 1-year anniversary, March 23, 2007.
 Jeramy Gordon was named to the Tri-County's 40 Under 40 list of business executives by the Pacific Coast Business Times on Oct 3, 2008.
 The Daily Sound wins two second place awards and one honorable mention from the California Newspaper Publishers Association.

Notes

External links
 Santa Barbara Daily Sound official Web site
 Peninsula Press Club write-up about the Daily Sound
 Peninsula Press Club "Publisher Delivers New Daily"
 Free-Daily.com "Santa Barbara Free Daily Adds Saturday"

Daily newspapers published in California
Santa Barbara, California
Free daily newspapers
Publications established in 2006